Lluïsa Casagemas i Coll (b. 13 Dec 1873, d. ? after 1930; one source says c. 1942) was a Catalan violinist, singer and composer. She was born in Barcelona and studied composition with Francesc de Paula Sánchez i Gavagnach and violin with Agustí Torelló. She began composing at an early age and made her debut as a composer in 1893 with a symphonic poem.

Casagemas' opera Schiava e regina won a prize at the World Columbian Exposition in Chicago in 1892; it has to be performed in 1893 at Gran Teatre del Liceu, Barcelona; it would be the first opera by a woman performed there. However, an anarchist attack with a bomb interrupted the opera season and the theatre was closed for months. So, the opera was not performed; as a compensation for the author, several fragments were performed before the Spanish royal family in Madrid in 1894. After, it was forgotten and never performed nor recorded.

Afterward Casagemas sang her own compositions at the salon of novelist Emilia Pardo Bazán, and he introduced her to musical and literary society.

Works
Casagemas composed sacred and instrumental works and a few songs. Selected works include:
Crepusculo for orchestra (1893)
Schiava e regina, opera (1879–1881)
I briganti; Montserrat, opera (op. 227)

Discography
 Compositores catalanes. Generació modernista (CD). Maria Teresa Garrigosa (soprano) and Heidrun Bergander (piano). La mà de guido. Dip.leg. B-45116-2008. Contains songs by Narcisa Freixas, Carmen Karr, Isabel Güell i López, and Luisa Casagemas.

References

1863 births
Year of death unknown
19th-century classical composers
Spanish women classical composers
Musicians from Catalonia
Composers from Catalonia
Spanish opera composers
Opera composers from Catalonia
Spanish classical composers
People from Barcelona
Women opera composers
19th-century women composers